Aaron James may refer to:

Aaron James (basketball) (born 1952), American basketball player
Aaron James (footballer) (born 1976), Australian rules footballer
Aaron James (organist) (born 1986), Canadian organist and musicologist

See also